George Thomas Smith (died 27 September 1915) was an English footballer who played in the Southern Football League for Crystal Palace.

Personal life
Smith served as a private in the Scots Guards during the First World War and was killed in action in France on 27 September 1915. He is commemorated on the Loos Memorial.

Career statistics

References

Year of birth missing
1915 deaths
Association footballers not categorized by position
English footballers
Southern Football League players
Crystal Palace F.C. players
King's Lynn F.C. players
British Army personnel of World War I
Scots Guards soldiers
British military personnel killed in World War I